Talk2 is a talk show hosted by Jim Rome on ESPN2 from 1993 to 1998. The show ran one hour at night.

Jim Everett incident
Jim Rome's show achieved the ultimate in notoriety when he welcomed Jim Everett onto the show on April 6, 1994. Jim Everett claimed for the past few years Rome had been calling him "Chris". Within the first few seconds of welcoming Everett onto the show, Rome instantly called out Everett by saying, "...somewhere along the way Jim, you ceased being Jim and you became Chris," a reference to female tennis player Chris Evert. Everett warned Rome that if he called him "Chris" one more time, they would have to cut to a commercial break. After Rome repeated "Chris," Everett attacked him, flipping over the table in the process.

In 2010, ESPN Classic began re-airing episodes of Talk2, including the infamous Jim Everett incident.

References

External links

 The Jim Rome Show — official site
 Stations which play the Jim Rome Show
 Stucknut - Jim Rome Fansite

1990s American television talk shows
ESPN2 original programming
1993 American television series debuts
1998 American television series endings
American sports television series